Unemployment Insurance Act may refer to:

 Unemployment Insurance Act 1920, an Act of the Parliament of the United Kingdom
 Unemployment Insurance Act 1921, an Act of the Parliament of the United Kingdom
 Unemployment Insurance (No. 2) Act 1921, an Act of the Parliament of the United Kingdom
 Unemployment Insurance Act 1922, an Act of the Parliament of the United Kingdom
 Unemployment Insurance (No. 2) Act 1922, an Act of the Parliament of the United Kingdom
 Unemployment Insurance Act 1923, an Act of the Parliament of the United Kingdom
 Unemployment Insurance Act 1924, an Act of the Parliament of the United Kingdom
 Unemployment Insurance (No. 2) Act 1924, an Act of the Parliament of the United Kingdom
 Unemployment Insurance (No. 3) Act 1924, an Act of the Parliament of the United Kingdom
 Unemployment Insurance Act 1925, an Act of the Parliament of the United Kingdom
 Unemployment Insurance Act 1926, an Act of the Parliament of the United Kingdom
 Unemployment Insurance Act 1927, an Act of the Parliament of the United Kingdom
 Unemployment Insurance Act 1928, an Act of the Parliament of the United Kingdom
 Unemployment Insurance Act 1929, an Act of the Parliament of the United Kingdom
 Unemployment Insurance Act 1930, an Act of the Parliament of the United Kingdom
 Unemployment Insurance (No. 2) Act 1930, an Act of the Parliament of the United Kingdom
 Unemployment Insurance (No. 3) Act 1930, an Act of the Parliament of the United Kingdom
 Unemployment Insurance (No. 4) Act 1930, an Act of the Parliament of the United Kingdom
 Unemployment Insurance Act 1931, an Act of the Parliament of the United Kingdom
 Unemployment Insurance (No. 2) Act 1931, an Act of the Parliament of the United Kingdom
 Unemployment Insurance (No. 3) Act 1931, an Act of the Parliament of the United Kingdom
 Unemployment Insurance Act 1935, an Act of the Parliament of the United Kingdom
 Unemployment Insurance Act 1938, an Act of the Parliament of the United Kingdom
 Unemployment Insurance Act 1939, an Act of the Parliament of the United Kingdom
 Unemployment Insurance Act 1940, an Act of the Parliament of the United Kingdom